Willie Edward Cullars (born August 4, 1951) is a former American football defensive end. He played for the Philadelphia Eagles of the National Football League (NFL) in 1974.

References

1951 births
Living people
People from Washington, Georgia
Players of American football from Georgia (U.S. state)
American football defensive ends
Kansas State Wildcats football players
Philadelphia Eagles players
Philadelphia Bell players